The following outline is provided as an overview of and topical guide to sustainability:

Sustainability – capacity to endure. For humans, sustainability is the long-term maintenance of well being, which has environmental, economic, and social dimensions, and encompasses the concept of stewardship and responsible resource management.

Essence of sustainability 
Sustainability

 Environmentalism
 Environmental ethics
 Planetary boundaries
 Sustainable development
 Sustainability science
 Sustainability accounting
 Sustainability governance
 Sustainability education

Taxonomy 
Sustainabiity is divided into two main branches: sustainability science and sustainability governance. Each of these branches is divided into a number of subfields:

Sub-fields of sustainability science 
Sustainability science
 Environmental impact assessment
 Environmental psychology
 Environmental philosophy
 Environmental law
 Sustainability measurement

Sub-fields of sustainability governance 

Sustainability governance

 Economic sector
 Circular economy
 Steady-state economy
 Sustainable art
 Sustainable advertising
 Sustainable architecture
 New Classical Architecture
 Sustainable business
 Sustainable fashion
 Sustainable industries
 Hannover Principles
 Sustainable landscape architecture
 Sustainable packaging
 Sustainable procurement
 Sustainable tourism
 Sustainable transport
 Political
 Organization
 Fisheries management
 Sustainable forest management
 Sustainable city
 New Urbanism
 Eco-cities
 Sustainable urban infrastructure
 Sustainable urban drainage systems
 Sustainable urban planning
 Sustainable community
 Sustainable Communities Plan
 Sustainability reporting
 Activity
 Sustainable design
 Sustainable living
 Sustainable yield

Related disciplines 

 Conservation biology
 Ecological humanities
 Environmental biotechnology
 Environmental chemistry
 Environmental design
 Environmental economics
 Environmental engineering
 Environmental ethics
 Environmental history
 Environmental law
 Environmental psychology
 Environmental science
 Environmental sociology
 Green politics

Biodiversity 

Biodiversity
 Biosecurity
 Ecosystem services
 Ecosystem-based management
 Ecosystem management
 Endangered species
 Holocene extinction event
 Invasive species
 Nature conservation

Levels of biological organisation 
 Biosphere
 Biome

Politics of sustainability 
 Rio Declaration on Environment and Development
 International reports and agreements
 United Nations Conference on the Human Environment (Stockholm 1972)
 Brundtlandt Commission Report, 1983
 Our Common Future, 1987
 Earth Summit (1992)
 Agenda 21 (1992)
 Convention on Biological Diversity (1992)
 ICPD Programme of Action (1994)
 Earth Charter
 Millennium Declaration (2000)
 Millennium Ecosystem Assessment (2005)
 Politics of global warming
 Climate change policy of the United States
 Climate change in China

Population control 
Population control

 Birth control
 Carrying capacity
 Family planning
 Human overpopulation
 Sustainable population
 Unintended pregnancy
 Zero population growth

Environmental technology 

 Environmental technology
 Sustainable energy
 Sustainable sanitation

 Renewable energy
 Biofuel
 Biomass

 Geothermal power
 Hydroelectricity
 Solar energy
 Tidal power
 Wave power
 Wind power

Energy conservation 
Energy conservation
 Carbon footprint
 Emissions trading
 Energy descent
 Peak oil
 Renewable energy (see above)

Over consumption 
Over-consumption
 Anti-consumerism
 Ecological footprint
 Ethical consumerism
 Tragedy of the commons
Micro-sustainability

Food 

Food
 Food security
 Local food
 Permaculture
 Sustainable agriculture
 Sustainable gardening
 Sustainable fisheries
 Urban horticulture

Water 
Water
 Water footprint
 Water crisis
 Water efficiency
 Water conservation

Materials 

Materials
 Industrial ecology
 Recycling
 Waste
 Zero waste

Sustainability organizations 

 Association of Environmental Professionals

Sustainability publications 
Sustainability (journal)

Leaders in sustainability 
:Category:Sustainability advocates

Paul Hawken

See also 

 Sustainability lists
 List of climate change topics
 List of conservation issues
 List of conservation topics
 List of environmental agreements
 List of environmental health hazards
 List of environmental issues
 List of environmental organizations
 Lists of environmental topics
 List of environmental studies topics
 List of global sustainability statistics

 Sustainability glossaries
 Glossary of climate change
 Glossary of environmental science

References

Sustainability
Sustainability